Melaleucia uparta is a moth of the family Erebidae first described by Michael Fibiger in 2008. It is known from south-central Sri Lanka.

There are probably multiple generations per year, with adults recorded in February, March, June, July, August and September.

The wingspan is 13–15 mm. The forewing is broad and white, although there is a terminal line in some specimens marked by black interveinal dots. The hindwing is light greyish brown, with an indistinct discal spot.

References

Micronoctuini
Moths described in 2008